This is a list of all captains of the Geelong Football Club, an Australian rules football club in the Australian Football League.

VFA (1879–1896)

VFL/AFL (1897–present)

AFL Women's

References

 
Geelong
captains